Chucky is an English masculine given name that is a diminutive form of Charles. Notable people known by this name include the following:

Nickname

Chucky, nickname of Vassily Ivanchuk (born 1969), Ukrainian chess grandmaster
Chucky Atkins, nickname of Kenneth Lavon Atkins (born 1974), American basketball player
Chucky Bartolo, nickname of Andrew Bartolo (born 1993), Maltese stand-up comedian and drag queen
Chucky Brown, nickname of Clarence Brown Jr., (born 1968), American basketball player
Chucky Ferreyra, nickname of Facundo Ferreyra (born 1991), Argentine footballer
Chucky Gruden, nickname of Jon Gruden (born 1963), American football coach
Chucky Jeffery, nickname of Janeesa Jeffery (born 1991), American female basketball player 
Chucky Klapow, nickname of Charles Klapow (born 1980), American choreographer and dance instructor
Chucky Lozano, nickname of Hirving Lozano (born 1995), Mexican footballer
Chucky Mullins, nickname of Roy Lee Mullins  (1969–1991), American gridiron football player
Chucky Thompson, nickname of Carl E. Thompson, (fl 1991 – present) American hip hop/R&B record producer
Chucky Venn or Chucky Venice, stage name of Charles Venn, (born 1973), English actor
Chucky Workclothes, nickname of Charles Ditchley (born 1984), American hip-hop artist
  Marcelo de Jesus Silva, nicknamed “Chucky”, Brazilian mass murderer

Fictional characters
Chucky (character), nickname of Charles Lee Ray in the Child's Play media franchise
Chucky, in the animated children's TV series Foofur
Chucky Pancamo, character from Oz
Chucky Signore, nickname of Charles Signore, character from The Sopranos
Rubber Chucky, character from Yin_Yang_Yo!

See also 

Chuck
Chuckii Booker
Chuckey Charles
Chucky Danger Band, former name of Paper Lions

Notes

English masculine given names